Wild is the fourth extended play (EP) by Australian singer Troye Sivan, released on 4 September 2015 by EMI Music Australia. It is Sivan's second extended play released through a major record label after TRXYE.

Sivan embarked on his first US tour titled Troye Sivan Live in support of the EP, later extended to a world tour after announcing Wild was an introduction to his debut studio album Blue Neighbourhood.

Background
On 25 July 2015, Sivan announced his fourth extended play at VidCon and described it as an "opening installment, a 6-song keyhole to introduce you guys to all of the music I've got coming in 2015." On 13 October 2015, it was revealed to be an introduction to his debut studio album Blue Neighbourhood.

Three songs from Wild were selected to be on the standard edition of the album, while all six songs were transferred to the deluxe edition. Those who had already purchased Wild received a discount to purchase Blue Neighbourhood.

Commercial performance

Wild debuted at number five in the United States, selling 50,000 units (45,000 total album sales). It has sold 60,000 albums in the US by late October 2015.
In Sivan's native Australia, Wild debuted at number one, and became the first extended play to do so.

Track listing

Charts

Weekly charts

Year-end charts

Release history

References

2015 EPs
Troye Sivan EPs
Universal Music Australia EPs